Meek is an unincorporated community in Holt County, Nebraska, United States.

History
Meek was named for Samuel Meek.

References

Unincorporated communities in Holt County, Nebraska
Unincorporated communities in Nebraska